Piloprepes anassa is a moth of the family Oecophoridae. It is found in the south-eastern quarter of mainland Australia.

The wingspan is about 20 mm.

See also
 Anassa, a Greek word meaning "queen"

References

Oecophoridae